Rudolf (also Rudolph or Rodolf, Italian Rodolfo) was the papal rector of the Duchy of Benevento under Pope Leo IX from 1053 to 1054. 

Rudolf was a Swabian captain who led that contingent of forces at the Battle of Civitate. His men were routed by Richard I of Aversa. Rudolf was made rector of Benevento after the pope concluded a treaty with the Normans. Rudolf did not hold his post for very long; the fickle Beneventans recalled their old princes, whom they had once expelled, Pandulf III and Landulf VI.

Sources
Gregorovius, Ferdinand. Rome in the Middle Ages Vol. IV Part 2. trans. Annie Hamilton. 1905. 

Swabian nobility
11th-century German clergy